Guraleus florus is a species of sea snails, a marine gastropod mollusk in the family Mangeliidae.

Description

Distribution
This marine species is endemic to Australia and can be found off Western Australia and Tasmania.

References

 Cotton, B.C. 1947. Some Southern Australian Turridae. South Australian Naturalist 24(3): 13-16
 Cotton, B.C. 1947. Australian Recent and Tertiary Turridae. Adelaide : Field Naturalist's Section of the Royal Society of South Australia. Conchology Club Vol. 4 pp. 1–34.

External links
  Tucker, J.K. 2004 Catalog of recent and fossil turrids (Mollusca: Gastropoda). Zootaxa 682:1–1295.

florus
Gastropods described in 1947
Gastropods of Australia